Rahim Osumanu (born 5 May 1995) is a Ghanaian professional footballer who plays as a striker for Gokulam Kerala (R) in Kerala Premier League.

Club career

Zesco United
Osumanu signed for Zesco United in their CAF Champions League squad.

ASO Chlef
Osumanu completed a move to Algerian top-flight side ASO Chlef on a free transfer.

Jimma Aba Jifar
Osumanu signed Ethiopian outfit Jimma Aba Jifar on a free transfer.

Gokulam Kerala
In August 2021, Osumanu signed for Indian club Gokulam Kerala FC in the I-League. He made his debut in their 1–0 win against Churchill Brothers on 26 December.

Career statistics

References

Ghanaian footballers
1995 births
Living people
Association football forwards
Gokulam Kerala FC players